HMS K2 was the second of the K class submarines and was built at HM Dockyard, Portsmouth, England. She was laid down on 13 November 1915 and was commissioned in May 1917 one year before the end of World War I. In January 1917, K2 was damaged by an explosion and fire during her first diving trials.

On 7 November 1924, K2 collided with  during exercises. K2 was sold on 13 July 1926 to John Cashmore Ltd for scrapping at Newport.

Design
Like all British K-class submarines, K2 had a displacement of  when at the surface and  while submerged. The submarine was powered by two oil-fired Yarrow Shipbuilders boilers and one geared Brown-Curtis or Parsons steam turbine; this developed 10,500 ship horsepower (7,800 kW) to drive two  screws. It also contained four electric motors each producing . It was also fitted with a diesel engine providing  to be used when steam was being generated.

K2 was fitted with a  anti-aircraft gun, ten  torpedo tubes, and two  deck guns. Its torpedo tubes were fitted to the bows, the midship section, and two were mounted on the deck. Its complement was fifty-nine crew members.

References

 
 

 

British K-class submarines
Royal Navy ship names
Ships built in Portsmouth
1916 ships